Richard Corgan is a Welsh actor. He was born and brought up in Cwmtwrch in January 1978. He went to Maesydderwen school, and later to Gorseinon College, Aberystwyth University and The Bristol Old Vic Theatre School.

Corgan's television roles include the recurring character Dafydd "Dav" Llewellyn in BBC One's Doctors and a leading role in two series of the BBC Wales drama Baker Boys.  He has also appeared in the BBC programmes Casualty, Caught in the Web, and THe B Word. From 2018 to 2020, he appeared in the BBC Three series In My Skin as Tony Chipper.

Corgan's films include the infamous low budget horror film Colin, and the short films Nowhere Fast and The Sunday. He also appeared in the Naomi Watts film Diana (2013).

References

Year of birth missing (living people)
Living people
Welsh male television actors
People from Powys